Elections to Lambeth London Borough Council were held in May 1986.  The whole council was up for election. Turnout was 43.0%.

Election result

|}

Ward results

References

1986
1986 London Borough council elections
20th century in the London Borough of Lambeth